Metalogy is a four CD + single DVD boxed set released by heavy metal band Judas Priest in 2004. The CDs come in card sleeves and are housed in a faux-leather box, which has studs around the center. The box was re-released in 2008 in a cardboard long-box containing the same 4 CDs as the original release, but not the DVD, which is sold separately. It was re-released for a second time in September 2013 as a hardback mediabook, again without the DVD.

Metalogy

Disc 5 (Live Vengeance '82 DVD)
"The Hellion/Electric Eye"
"Riding on the Wind"
"Heading Out to the Highway"
"Metal Gods"
"Bloodstone"
"Breaking the Law"
"Sinner"
"Desert Plains"
"The Ripper"
"Diamonds & Rust"
"Devil's Child"
"Screaming for Vengeance"
"You've Got Another Thing Comin'"
"Victim of Changes"
"Living After Midnight"
"The Green Manalishi (With the Two Pronged Crown)"
"Hell Bent for Leather"

Personnel
Rob Halford – Vocals on Discs 1–3, tracks 1–10 on Disc 4, and Disc 5
Tim "Ripper" Owens – Vocals on tracks 11–14 on Disc 4
K.K. Downing – Guitar
Glenn Tipton – Guitar
Ian Hill – Bass
John Hinch – Drums on "Never Satisfied" on Disc 1
Alan Moore – Drums on "Deceiver" and "Tyrant" on Disc 1
Simon Phillips – Drums on tracks 7–9 on Disc 1
Les Binks – Drums on tracks 4–6 and 10–15 on Disc 1, and tracks 1–6 on Disc 2
Dave Holland – Drums on tracks 7–19 on Disc 2, all of Disc 3, tracks 1–4 on Disc 4, and all of Disc 5
Scott Travis – Drums on tracks 5–14 on Disc 4

Charts

References

Judas Priest compilation albums
Live video albums
2004 live albums
2004 video albums
2004 compilation albums
Columbia Records compilation albums
Columbia Records live albums
Columbia Records video albums